Jug Canyon is a valley in Sierra County, New Mexico. Its mouth is at its confluence with Outlaw Canyon at an elevation of 4,511 feet / 1,375 meters, where they form the head of Arroyo Cuervo which flows into the Rio Grande to the east, in Dona Ana County, New Mexico.

References

Landforms of Sierra County, New Mexico